Yang Joon-hyuk is a South Korean retired professional baseball player. A left-handed hitter and outfielder, he spent most of his career with the Samsung Lions. He is known by the nickname "Yangshin" (양신, 梁神), or "God, Yang". He retired from baseball after the 2010 season.

Yang led the league in batting four times, and holds six career batting records (including at one time the home runs record with 351, now surpassed by Lee Seung-yeop). His number 10 was retired by the Lions.

In popular culture
As of April 2011, he is a member of Happy Sunday's Qualifying Men, a Korean reality-variety show on the KBS2 network

In March 2022, Yang has signed an contract with General Entertainment.

Filmography

Television show

See also 
 List of KBO career home run leaders 
 List of KBO career RBI leaders

References

External links

Baseball announcers
Baseball players at the 1990 Asian Games
Baseball players with retired numbers
Haitai Tigers players
KBO League Rookie of the Year Award winners
KBO League designated hitters
KBO League first basemen
KBO League left fielders
KBO League right fielders
Living people
LG Twins players
Samsung Lions players
South Korean baseball players
South Korean television personalities
Sportspeople from Daegu
Asian Games competitors for South Korea
Year of birth missing (living people)